The Basch & Fisher Tobacco Warehouse is an historic tobacco warehouse which is located in Lancaster, Lancaster County, Pennsylvania, United States. 

It was listed on the National Register of Historic Places in 1990.

History and architectural features
Built circa 1880, this warehouse is a one-and-one-half-story, rectangular, brick building, four bays wide and five bays deep, with a front gable roof. It sits on a stone foundation covered in stucco or brick.

It was listed on the National Register of Historic Places in 1990.

References

Industrial buildings and structures on the National Register of Historic Places in Pennsylvania
Industrial buildings completed in 1880
Buildings and structures in Lancaster, Pennsylvania
Tobacco buildings in the United States
National Register of Historic Places in Lancaster, Pennsylvania
1880 establishments in Pennsylvania